Nidaros is a diocese in the Lutheran Church of Norway. It covers Trøndelag county in Central Norway and its cathedral city is Trondheim, which houses the well-known Nidaros Cathedral.  Since 10 September 2017, the Bishop of Nidaros is Herborg Finnset.  The Bishop Preses, currently Olav Fykse Tveit is also based at the Nidaros Cathedral.  The diocese is divided into nine deaneries (prosti).  While the Bishop Preses holds episcopal responsibility within the Nidaros domprosti (deanery) in Trondheim, the Bishop of Nidaros holds episcopal authority of the other eight deaneries as well as the language based parish of the Southern Sámi.

History
The diocese of Nidaros was established in 1068. It originally covered the (modern) counties of Trøndelag, Nordland, Troms, and Finnmark, along with the regions of Nordmøre and Romsdal (in Møre og Romsdal county) and Härjedalen (in Sweden), and also the northern part of Østerdalen (Tynset, Tolga, and Os). The region of Sunnmøre (in Møre og Romsdal) was transferred from Diocese of Bjørgvin to the new Archdiocese of Nidaros some time after 1152 – to secure it more income.

The northern part of Østerdalen was transferred to the Diocese of Oslo some time after 1537. The province of Jämtland was transferred from Diocese of Uppsala to Nidaros in 1570. The region of Sunnmøre was transferred (back) from Nidaros to the Diocese of Bjørgvin in 1622. The provinces of Jämtland and Härjedalen were lost to Sweden in 1645. Northern Norway was established as a diocese of its own in 1804 (formally first in 1844). The parish of Innset was transferred from Diocese of Hamar to Nidaros in 1966. The regions of Nordmøre and Romsdal (together with Sunnmøre from Bjørgvin) were established as a diocese of its own (Diocese of Møre) in 1983.

Structure

The Diocese of Nidaros is divided into nine deaneries.  Each one corresponds to several municipalities in the diocese.  Each municipality is further divided into one or more parishes which each contain one or more congregations. In addition, the Parish of the Southern Sámi language area fall under the Bishop of Nidaros authority, while the Trondheim parish of the Deaf is pastored by the Deanery of Church of the Deaf and the Bishop of Oslo.

Bishops
The bishops of Nidaros since the Protestant Reformation when Norway switched from Catholicism to Lutheranism:

1546–1548 Torbjørn Bratt 
1549–1578 Hans Gaas  
1578–1595 Hans Mogenssøn  
1596–1617 Isak Grønbech  
1618–1622 Anders Arrebo  
1622–1642 Peder Skjelderup  
1643–1672 Erik Bredal 
1672–1672 Arnold de Fine 
1673–1678 Erik Eriksen Pontoppidan d.e.  
1678–1688 Christopher Hanssen Schletter  
1689–1731 Peder Krog  
1731–1743 Eiler Hansen Hagerup 
1743–1748 Ludvig Harboe  
1748–1758 Frederik Nannestad  
1758–1773 Johan Ernst Gunnerus 
1773–1789 Marcus Fredrik Bang 
1788–1803 Johan Christian Schønheyder  
1804–1842 Peder Olivarius Bugge  
1843–1849 Hans Riddervold 
1849–1860 Hans Jørgen Darre 
1861–1883 Andreas Grimelund 
1884–1892 Niels Laache 
1892–1905 Johannes Nilssøn Skaar 
1905–1909 Vilhelm Andreas Wexelsen 
1909–1923 Peter W. K. Bøckman Sr. 
1923–1928 Jens Gran Gleditsch 
1928–1942 Johan Nicolai Støren 
1945–1960 Arne Fjellbu  
1960–1979 Tord Godal  
1979–1991 Kristen Kyrre Bremer 
1991–2008 Finn Wagle 
2008–2017 Tor Singsaas
2017–present Herborg Finnset

See also
 List of Lutheran dioceses and archdioceses

References

Nidaros
Organisations based in Trondheim
1068 establishments in Europe
11th-century establishments in Norway
Former Catholic dioceses in Sweden